Ken Lockie (born 1956) is an English singer-songwriter and producer, best known as the creative force behind English new wave band Cowboys International and as a sometime collaborator with John Lydon in Public Image Ltd.

Early life and education

He was born in Newcastle upon Tyne in 1956 as Peter Dellow and changed his name to Ken Lockie by Deed poll on 8 January 1980.

Career

Cowboys International
Ken Lockie, a keyboardist for Cowboys International, was recording his first Virgin album (The Impossible) when Simple Minds signed with the label. The band took an interest in his work after hearing backing tracks, and hired its producer Steve Hillage to produce their next album (Sons And Fascination).

Lockie fronted his own band Cowboys International, releasing the album The Original Sin (1979).  The band recorded and played with many punk- and new wave-era musicians including:

 Terry Chimes from the English punk-rock band The Clash
 Jimmy Hughes of the English punk-rock and new-wave band The Banned and the British new-wave band Department S
 Keith Levene from the English post-punk band Public Image Ltd
 Marco Pirroni of the English rock band Adam and the Ants
 Steve Shears of the English new-wave band Ultravox
 Paul Simon of the English new-wave band Radio Stars

Solo career
The band toured extensively throughout the UK and in Europe in 1980, at which point Lockie pursued a solo career with Virgin Records, releasing the album The Impossible (1981), featuring guest appearances by Shears and Simon, as well as:

 Preston Heyman of the English rock band Tom Robinson Band
 Jim Kerr of the Scottish rock band Simple Minds
 John McGeoch of the English punk-rock band Magazine
 Nash the Slash

Public Image Ltd
Later in 1981, Lockie went to the United States to join Public Image Ltd (PiL) in New York City, New York, in 1981 in preparation for recording in Chicago, Illinois, in November of that year.  His contributions to PiL stemmed back to PiL's album Metal Box (1979) where he contributed and co-wrote "Radio 4" (although not officially credited).

Due to complications with Virgin and funding, recording in 1981 was delayed.  PiL entered into various recording sessions in New York City during this period until finally entering into Park South Studios to record what became Commercial Zone (1984) in 1982 and 1983.  At this point, Lockie was no longer a contributor to PiL.

Independent Producer
After his departure from PIL in 1982, Lockie found some success in dance music, co-producing, with Ivan Baker; and co-writing, with Stuart Agarbright, the song "Dominatrix Sleeps Tonight".  Arthur Baker of Streetwise Records picked up on the single and it became a success in the spring of 1984 (number one on the Billboard Dance Chart for ten weeks).  This track would later become part of the soundtrack to the American comedy film Grosse Pointe Blank (1997).  In 1985, CBS / Epic Records released the 12" Single "Get On Top" and "K2" under the band name Go For Your Gun, produced by Ken Lockie the single featured Stuart Argabright and Laura Lockie.

Pnuma Recordings
In 2003, he founded his own label Pnuma Recordings, and re-issued a collection of Cowboys International recordings from The Original Sin album and various singles on CD.  He recorded a new Cowboys International album The Backwards Life of Romeo (2004), performing a live show at Eyedrum in Atlanta, Georgia, in 2005.  In 2011 and continuing to 2019, Lockie began producing and releasing Techno, Tech House, Minimal, Deep House and other genres on the Pnuma Recordings label.

Discography

Cowboys International
Studio albums
 1979 The Original Sin
 2004  The Backwards Life of Romeo 

Compilations
 2003 Revisited

Singles
 1979 "Thrash"
 1979 "Aftermath"
 1979 "Nothing Doing"
 1980 "Today Today"

Solo
Studio albums
1981 The Impossible

Singles
 1981 "Dance House"
 1981 "Today"

Related releases and collaborations
 1979 "Radio 4" by Public Image Ltd; keyboards
 1981 Sons and Fascination/Sister Feelings Call by Simple Minds; backing vocals

See also

 List of people from Newcastle upon Tyne

References

External links
 
 

1956 births
Living people
20th-century composers
20th-century English singers
20th-century English writers
21st-century composers
21st-century English singers
21st-century English writers
English company founders
English electronic musicians
English expatriates in the United States
English new wave musicians
English male singer-songwriters
English pop singers
English record producers
English rock keyboardists
Expatriate musicians in the United States
Public Image Ltd members
Musicians from Newcastle upon Tyne
British post-punk musicians
Synth-pop singers
Virgin Records artists